The Universal Machine Gun Model 1959 (Czech: Univerzální kulomet vzor 59) is a general-purpose machine gun developed in Czechoslovakia in the 1950s. It remains in use by the Czech Army and the Slovak Armed Forces.

Description 
The Uk vz. 59 fires 7.62×54mmR ammunition (although a Vz. 59N variant for 7.62×51mm NATO ammunition also exists), delivered via an ammunition belt. The weapon can serve as a light (light barrel and bipod, vz. 59L model) and medium machine gun (heavy barrel and tripod), and can also be used as a co-axial mounted weapon (Vz. 59T version).

The pistol grip acts as the charging handle for the Uk vz. 59.

Users

: Armed Forces of the Democratic Republic of the Congo
 Democratic Forces for the Liberation of Rwanda

 
 
 
 : 3,200 UK vz.59s were gifted from the Czech Republic, sent as part of a military package in response to the 2022 Russian invasion of Ukraine.
 : used by the PAVN and Viet Cong during the Vietnam War/

Gallery

See also
URZ AP

References

External links 

 Modern Firearms
 Univerzální kulomet vzor 59

7.62×54mmR machine guns
7.62×51mm NATO machine guns
Infantry weapons of the Cold War
General-purpose machine guns
Machine guns of Czechoslovakia
Military equipment introduced in the 1950s